Spain-Morocco interconnection is a submarine power cable between Tarifa terminal in Spain and Fardioua terminal in Morocco. The purpose of the cable is to connect energy infrastructure between Europe and Africa.

The Spain-Morocco interconnection includes two 400 kV lines, commissioned in 1997 and 2006 that have a combined power of 800 MW and consisting of seven cables: three for each circuit, plus one for reserve.

Expansion
The two countries are planning to extend the network building a third 400-kV link with a 700 MW capacity. The cost of the project is expected to be $169 million, shared equally between Spain and Morocco.

See also
 Energy in Spain
 Energy in Morocco
 Xlinks Morocco-UK Power Project

References

External links
REE page

Electrical interconnectors to and from the Synchronous Grid of Continental Europe
Submarine power cables
HVDC transmission lines
Electric power infrastructure in Spain
Electric power infrastructure in Morocco
Morocco–Spain relations
1997 establishments in Spain
1997 establishments in Morocco
Energy infrastructure completed in 1997